Mahlacheh (also Romanized as Mahalcheh and Maḩlacheh; also known as Mahlakeh and Mahlejeh) is a village in Fishvar Rural District, Evaz District, Larestan County, Fars Province, Iran. At the 2006 census, its population was 642, in 110 families.

References 

Populated places in Evaz County